"If You Leave Me Now" is a 1976 song by American band Chicago.

If You Leave Me Now may also refer to:
 If You Leave Me Now (album), a 1983 compilation by Chicago
 "If You Leave Me Now" (Charlie Puth song), 2018
 "If You Leave Me Now", a 2016 song by Foxes from the album All I Need
 "If You Leave Me Now", a 1989 song by Jaya
 "If You Leave Me NoW, a 2000 song by Mónica Naranjo from the album Minage